Carol McCartney is a former Canadian beauty competition winner. She is a notable jazz singer and award-winning recording artist who is a well-known performer in the Canadian jazz scene.

Background
Carol McCartney grew up on Verobeach Blvd. She went to Gulfstream Public School and then later Emery Collegiate Institute. At the age of 16 her father entered her in the Miss Toronto pageant. She won the 1978 title and was the third runner up in the Miss Canada event.  She got her Bachelor of Music Theatre Performance degree from Sheridan college in 1981.

She has been the featured singer with the Toronto, Vancouver, Nashville and Detroit orchestras and at least twenty more. Her album A Night in Tunisia was very well received and was in good standing with the critics. She was a headline act at the Brantford International Jazz Festival in 2013. 

She has had a street named after her. In 2013, The City of Toronto named a Weston Street, "McCartney Street" as she grew up there.

She has been nominated in the past for a Juno Award and the Mississauga Arts Council presented her with a Marty Award from the for best Established Artist in 2014. 

She is married to Jesse Collins.

Career

1980s to 1990s
Sometime in the 1980s McCartney recorded the album, Stop Foolin' Around for the Century Recording And Productions Inc. label. The title song was written by Paul Zaza and featured him on keyboards. It was from the film, Breaking All the Rules and that version was sung by Yvonne Murray. She also had two 12" singles released. They were "Slow Down" bw "I Can't Understand" on ZSP ZSP-2348 and "If You Love Me Like You Say You Love Me" bw "If You Love Me Like You Say You Love Me" (Instrumental Version) on Century Recording And Productions Inc. ACR-5042.

In September 1987, she was at the Miss Canada Pageant with Michael Danso singing a Gershwin melody as part of the musical entertainment side that featured songs of Cole Porter and Gershwin.

2000s
In February 2006, she was fronting the Edmonton Symphony Orchestra in a tribute to Benny Goodman, featuring Bob DeAngelis, appearing at the Winspear Centre on a Friday and Saturday. Also, with her and the orchestra were musicians, John McLeod on Trumpet, and Lorne Nehring on drums.

Her album A Night in Tunisia was released in 2007. It was a mixture of ballads, blues and up-tempo tracks, which included the songs, "No More Blues" and "Ev'ry Time We Say Goodbye". Two musicians that guested on the album were, vibes player Peter Appleyard and horn player Guido Basso. It was reviewed by Michael P. Gladstone for All About Jazz gave the album a 3 and a half star rating, saying that she could deliver ballads from the Great American Song Book as well as well as up-tempo jazz standards, giving "A Night in Tunisia" as an example etc.

In July, 2011 she was set to appear at the Academy Theatre stage for the theater's 2011 Curtain's Up summer season.
In December that year she was appearing at The Jazz Room at the Huether Hotel in Uptown Waterloo with her group, the Carol McCartney Quartet.

She was one of the headline acts for The Brantford International Jazz Festival that ran from the 14th to 16 September 2013. She was booked for the Bell Stage at 2pm on Saturday for a one-hour performance. Her backing group was made up of Brian Dickinson on piano, Kieran Overs on bass, Frank DiFelice on drums and Chris Robinson on saxophone.
Be Cool album
In 2014, her album Be Cool was released. The musicians who played on it were, Terry Clarke on drums, Brian Dickinson on piano; Lorne Lofsky on guitar, Mike Malone on flugelhorn, Kieran Overs on bass, and Chris Robinson on tenor saxophone and alto saxophone. The majority of the arrangements were taken care of by Brian Dickinson who was the pianist on the album. McCartney produced the album herself. However, Brian Wray who had been a member of 70s groups, Truck, Motherlode  and Natural Gas, did some arranging on this album.  His arrangements on Natural Gas' "All Powerful Man" gave the group a hit in 1970.

In his review of the album, Edward Blanco of All About Jazz called it "An astonishing vocal jazz project" and"Well worth the wait". He also gave it a four star rating. The Metroland Media Group's Mississauga.com reviewer said that the album was the mature work of an assured pro.

Following the release of her album she appeared at Tornonto's Jazz Bistro for a three-night run. It was the second night on Friday, October 24 that was singled out. The review was very good with the reviewer, noting the variation in material and saying that McCartney and her all-star band tore up on that night. Three of the songs she performed were, Cole Porter's "Night and Day", the Wes Montgomery classic "West Coast Blues" and Joni Mitchell's "Be Cool".

Discography (selective)

Further reading
 !earshot The Carol McCartney Interview By Jim Dupuis
 Talkin' Broadway, 15 May 2015 - Sound Advice Reviews, Born in Canada, Living in Jazzland Two Female Vocalists and Their bands

References

External links
 Website
 Discogs: Carol McCartney
 Music Metason: Carol McCartney
 YouTube - Carol McCartney - Topic: A Night in Tunisia

Living people
21st-century Canadian women singers
Canadian jazz singers
Year of birth missing (living people)